The Bab Iskender ( Iskander's Strait, also variously known as the Eastern strait, the small strait, the narrow pass or the small pass,  is the eastern section of the Bab-el-Mandeb straits, which separates Ras Menheli, Yemen, on the Arabian Peninsula from Ras Siyyan, Djibouti, on the Horn of Africa. The Yemeni island of Perim divides the strait into two channels, Bab Iskender and Dact-el-Mayun respectively.

Near the African coast lies a group of smaller islands known as the Seven Brothers.

References

Straits of the Indian Ocean
Mandeb, Bab-el-
Mandeb, Bab-el-
Borders of Yemen
Borders of Djibouti
International straits
Straits of Africa
Straits of Asia